Josh One (born Joshua Noteboom, March 14, 1975 in Sioux City, Iowa, United States) is an American producer and DJ, based in Long Beach, California.

History
His debut recording as a solo artist was "Contemplation", in 2001. He remixed the three time, Grammy Award nominated Nappy Roots "Po' Folk's" on Atlantic Records. Josh One's debut album, Narrow Path, was released in 2004, and featured Aloe Blacc and Myka 9. His second album Tolerance, was released in 2009. He remixed Fitz and the Tantrums "Out of My League" that went platinum sales and hit No. 1 on the Billboard Alternative chart, on Elektra Records.

In 2005 he created Boomnote Music, an independent record label and production company.

Discography

Solo albums
 Grey Skies EP Immergent (2003)
 Narrow Path LP Immergent (2004)
 Tolerance LP Boomnote Music (2009)
 Tolerance (Instrumentals & Remixes) Boomnote Music (2010)
 Wrong Way Remixes EP Plug Research Records (2015)
 Further Remixed EP Boomnote Music (2016)
 Time Stamp LP Boomnote Music (2017)
 Time Stamp (Instrumentals) LP Boomnote Music (2018)

References

External links
 Boomnote Music

1975 births
Living people
American DJs
Record producers from Iowa
People from Sioux City, Iowa